Jonathan Cole (born 21 December 1970 in Welwyn Garden City) is a British composer and Head of Composition at the Royal College of Music.

Biography
Jonathan Cole attended Christ's Hospital school before studying composition at King's College London, the Guildhall School of Music and Drama and Royal Holloway, University of London where he graduated with a PhD in 2001. His teachers included Simon Bainbridge, Simon Holt and Malcolm Williamson. His work first achieved public notice with Ouroboros I (1999). He has enjoyed a fruitful relationship with the London Sinfonietta who have premiered three pieces and has received commissions from the BBC, Nash Ensemble, RAI Orchestra, Turin and the London Symphony Orchestra amongst others. His music has been widely performed in festivals across the world and has been supported by such figures as Oliver Knussen, George Benjamin and Mark Anthony Turnage. Influenced as much by the sounds of London and free-improvisation as by such figures as Stockhausen, Cage and Nono, his music explores perception and memory in rich and imaginative ways.
From 2009–2013 he was composer-in-association with the London Contemporary Orchestra and in 2012 he was instrumental in setting up the re:sound collective.
Jonathan Cole is well known as a teacher of composition having taught at the Royal College of Music since 2005 where he was appointed Head of Composition in 2022. Prior to this, he taught at King's College, London and the Purcell School.

Key Dates
1999 – awarded the Royal Philharmonic Composition Prize
2001 – signed exclusive publishing contract with G.Ricordi & co., London
2006 – appointed professor of composition at the Royal College of Music
2008 – appointed composer-in-association with the London Contemporary Orchestra
2018 – awarded fellowship of the Royal College of Music (FRCM)

Selected works
 Caught (1998)
 Ouroboros II (2000)
 Assassin Hair (2002)
 Penumbra (2004)
 Testament (2005)
 Scrawling Out (2006)
 Simulacrum (2008)
 Tss-K-Haa (2008)
 Burburbabbar Za (2009)
 Ash Relics (2010)
 Nadanu (2012)
 Menhir (2013)
 Anuras (2014)
 50 Florentine Breaths (2017)
 13 Verses (2017)
 A Passing Moment (2019)
 Templum (2019)

Selected Recordings 
 Caught – NMC D076
 Testament – SINF CD1 2007
 tss-k-haa – NMC D150
 50 Florentine Breaths – EMA Vinci contemporanea 700121 1CD

References 

Young Noises at the concert hall (Independent on Sunday – 9 April 2000)
 Jonathan Cole’s soundcloud page
 Jonathan Cole page at Ricordi
 Jonathan Cole page at the Living Composer’s project 

English composers
Living people
1970 births
Alumni of King's College London
Alumni of the Guildhall School of Music and Drama
Alumni of Royal Holloway, University of London
People from Welwyn Garden City
Musicians from Hertfordshire
People educated at Christ's Hospital
Academics of the Royal College of Music